Ang Lihim ng Isang Pulo: Nobelang Tagalog (kasaysayang ukol sa mga unang panahon) – "The Secret of an Island: A Tagalog Novel (history about times past)" – is a Tagalog-language novel written in 1926 by Filipino novelist Faustino S. Aguilar.  The 353-page novel was first published by Sampaguita Press in the Philippines in 1927.  It was republished in Manila by Benipayo Press in 1958.

References

Philippine novels
1926 novels
Tagalog-language novels
Historical novels